Parisienne or La Parisienne means a grammatically female person or thing from Paris, France. It may also refer to:

Arts and entertainment
 La Parisienne (fresco), a fresco at the palace of Knossos
 , by Henry Becque (1885)
 "La Parisienne" (song), an 1830 song by Casimir Delavigne that served as the French national anthem during the July Monarchy
 La Parisienne (Hidalgo painting), an 1889 painting by Félix Resurrección Hidalgo
 La Parisienne (Renoir painting), an 1874 painting by Pierre-Auguste Renoir
 Une Parisienne, a 1957 film starring Brigitte Bardot
 Parisienne (film), a 2015 French film
 Parisienne Walkways (song), a song by Gary Moore

Other uses
 Parisienne (cigarette), a Swiss brand
 Pontiac Parisienne, General Motors automobile models
 Société Parisienne, Belle Epoque manufacturer of automobiles
 Parisienne (perfume), a women's perfume produced by Yves Saint Laurent
 A walnut cultivar